Osasu Edobor (formerly known as Osasu Paul-Azino) is a Nigerian gender advocate and founder of Think Help Restore(THR) Media and the Safe Space Initiative. She is a licensed Mental Health First-Aider, Peer Educator Trainer, and Counselor. As a campaigner for gender inclusion, Osasu created the HERFessions app, which provides support for survivors of sexual abuse. She is a 2018 Mandela Washington Fellow alumna and a Young African Leaders Initiative member.

Education 
Osasu completed a bachelor’s degree in Chemistry at the Lagos State University in 2008 and a certificate in Social Sector Management from Lagos Business School, Pan-Atlantic University in 2016. Thereafter, she proceeded to the University of Lagos and earned a master’s degree in Managerial psychology. As a Mandela Washington Fellowship Scholar, she earned a Civic Leadership certificate from Rutgers University, New Brunswick in 2018.

Career 
She worked as the Program Director at Pastor Bimbo Odukoya Foundation(PBOF), a nonprofit organization committed to supporting and training women and youth in disadvantaged areas. As program director, she inaugurated the S.H.A.RP4U project, a campaign to raise awareness of sexual harassment and counsel rape victims. In tertiary institutions in Nigeria. Osasu spearheaded the 2016 edition of the PBOF girl empowerment program, held in commemoration of the International Day of the Girl Child.

Currently, she is the founder and director of programs at THR Media, a social enterprise that uses new technology and media to help women and girls escape sexual and gender-based violence, including domestic violence, trafficking, and other forms of exploitation. Osasu launched the HERFessions mobile application in 2018. The application is an anonymous platform designed to assist victims and survivors of sexual and gender-based violence. The platform includes an online chat room that enables survivors to interact with one another and consult with psychologists, lawyers, and other stakeholders interested in educating, supporting and counseling victims of gender-based violence. Also, the app has a feature button to report abuse. She hosts quarterly events aimed at supporting victims of sexual and gender-based violence through the Safe Space Initiative.

As an activist and gender advocate, she joined the coalition of gender advocates to demand investigation of rape allegations and justice for rape victims.

Awards 

 2018 Mandela Fellow, Civic Leadership
 2022, HILL Accelerator Winner

References

External links
 THR Media
 HERFessions App
Safe Space Initiative

Sexual abuse victim advocates
Nigerian women activists
Nigerian feminists
Living people
Year of birth missing (living people)